The Finnish Swimming Federation (officially Suomen Uimaliitto – Finska Simförbundet r.y.) is the national governing body of swimming, water polo, synchronised swimming, diving and open water swimming in Finland. It is one of the founding members of FINA. It is also a member of LEN and the Finnish Olympic Committee.

Finnish championships 

 1906 Finnish championships in aquatics
 1907 Finnish championships in aquatics
 1908 Finnish championships in aquatics
 1909 Finnish championships in aquatics
 1910 Finnish championships in aquatics
 1911 Finnish championships in aquatics
 1912 Finnish championships in aquatics
 1913 Finnish championships in aquatics
 1914 Finnish championships in aquatics
 1915 Finnish championships in aquatics
 1916 Finnish championships in aquatics
 1917 Finnish championships in aquatics
 1918 Finnish championships in aquatics
 1919 Finnish championships in aquatics
 1920 Finnish championships in aquatics
 1921 Finnish championships in aquatics
 1922 Finnish championships in aquatics

References

External links
 Official website

Finland
National members of FINA
Aquatics